One is the third studio album by Swedish Muslim singer-songwriter, Maher Zain, was released on June 6, 2016 by Awakening Records.

Music videos
 The first music video from the album was titled "The Power"(on Arabic "Bil'thikr") . It was released on May 6, 2016. The video was translated into two languages, English and Arabic
 The second music video from the album was "Peace Be Upon You". It was released on May 27, 2016. Zain re-recorded this music in Bahasa Indonesia for Indonesian audiences.
 The third music video entitled "The Way of Love", was released on June 23, 2016. This video was translated into three languages, English, Arabic and Turkish.
 The fourth music video entitled "I'm Alive", was released on 9 September 2016 featuring Atif Aslam.
 The fifth music video entitled "Close to You", was released on 11 December 2016.

Track listing
The full track list was announced at iTunes on June 6, 2016

References

2016 albums
Arabic-language albums
Maher Zain albums
Awakening Music albums